NEGP may refer to:

 National e-Governance Plan (NeGP), an Indian government initiative
 National Education Goals Panel, which was replaced by No Child Left Behind in 2002
 Nord Stream (disambiguation), North European Gas Pipeline